Kenneth Flower, GLM (1914 - 2 September 1987) was a Rhodesian police officer and intelligence chief.

Biography 
Flower was born in Cornwall, England. After war service in British Somaliland and Ethiopia he returned to Rhodesia in 1948, rapidly rising in the hierarchy of the BSAP. He studied the Mau Mau insurgency in Kenya and applied his knowledge in the disturbances in British Nyasaland during the late 1950s.

Flower was appointed Deputy Commissioner of the BSAP in March 1961 and subsequently served as the first head of Rhodesia's and later Zimbabwe's Central Intelligence Organisation. The organisation had been set up by him under Prime Minister Winston Field in 1963 though the original initiative for such an agency had come from Field's predecessor Sir Edgar Whitehead. Flower saw himself as non-political, though with a bias against the 'cowboy element' in the Rhodesian Front, as he dubbed it. Ken Flower has been tied to the creation of RENAMO, a tribally-based guerrilla organization in Mozambique.

In 1980, when Robert Mugabe became the first Prime Minister of the state of Zimbabwe, he kept Flower as CIO boss as well as other top officials in his predominantly black, first administration.

Flower wrote Serving Secretly: An Intelligence Chief on Record, Rhodesia into Zimbabwe 1964-1981, published in 1987.

Controversy
ZANU militant Fay Chung claims in March 1975 Flower ordered the assassination of Herbert Chitepo, then leader of the Zimbabwe African National Union.

There are allegations that after Ian Smith unilaterally declared Rhodesia independent, Flower maintained his allegiance to the British government and spied on the Smith administration for MI6. In 2011 the BBC Radio 4 programme Documents featured testimony from Lord Owen that Flower had been an MI6 mole for Britain during his tenure as head of Rhodesian CIO and that his disclosure of Rhodesian plans had enabled Mugabe to survive assassination and become the first prime minister of Zimbabwe, following independence.

References

1914 births
1987 deaths
White Rhodesian people
Zimbabwean spies
British South Africa Police officers
Rhodesian politicians
Zimbabwean politicians
British emigrants
People of Cornish descent
British emigrants to Rhodesia